Divakar Sharma (born 5 April 1933) is an Indian scholar of Sanskrit, Hindi and Rajasthani languages.

Biography
Born in Churu, India, Sharma received his Master of Arts (M.A.) from Kota and a Doctor of Philosophy (Ph.D.) degree from the University of Rajasthan, Jaipur. Divakar Sharma received his tutelage in history and culture from his father, the Sanskrit scholar Vidyavachaspati Vidyadhar Shastri and his father's younger brother, Professor Dasharatha Sharma.
  
Divakar Sharma was appointed as lecturer in Sanskrit at the Dungar College, Bikaner and retired from that position in 1991. He then headed an institution for research and promotion of Sanskrit, Hindi and Rajasthani literature, the Hindi Vishwa Bharati Anusandhan Parishad, Bikaner. Additionally he was the editor of the institution's principal research publication Vishwambhara.

Editorial responsibilities
Divakar Sharma was the editor of the quarterly Hindi Vishwa Bharati  publication Vishwambhara. For an extended period, he was also the editor of the Rajasthani Gyanpith Sansthan's  principal periodical Rajasthani Ganga. He also served on the editorial boards of the periodicals Varada, Vaicharaki and Kala-Darshan.

Honors
He was honored at the Vishisht Vidvat Samman by the Rajasthan Sanskrit Academy, Jaipur and as Vishist Sahityakar by the Rajasthan Sahitya Academy, Udaipur. Numerous cultural and literary organizations of Rajasthan also conferred honors on him. He became famous at Reality Musical Game Show

Memberships
Divakar Sharma is a member of the Board of Directors of the Rajasthan Sahitya Academy, Udaipur and treasurer of the Rajasthani Language and Culture Academy. He was a member and official of many other literary and cultural organizations.

Bibliography
Rajasthan ke Sanskrit sahitya-srajan mein Bikaner kshetra ka yogdan, 1472-1965 (Rajasthan's contribution to Sanskrit literature with special reference to Bikaner 1472-1965 A.D.), in Hindi, includes passages in Sanskrit. Publisher: Kalasan Prakashan, Bikaner 2008
Vichitra Patram
Dasharatha Sharma lekha-sangraha ( Selected articles from writings of Dasharatha Sharma, Hindi author and historian) in Hindi  Editors: Divakar Sharma, Manohar Sharma. Publisher: Hindi Visvabharati Anusandhan Parishad, Bikaner 1977
Giradhari Singh Parihar: vyaktitva aur krititva (On the works of Giradhariisingh Paṛihar, Rajasthani and Hindi poet; includes selections from his works) in Rajasthani language. Publisher: Rajasthani Gyanpith Sansthan, Bikaner 2001

References

External links
Rajasthan ke Sanskrit sahitya-srajan mein Bikaner kshetra ka yogdan at Library of Congress
Dasharatha Sharma lekha-sangraha at Library of Congress
Giradhari Singh Parihar: vyaktitva aur krititva at Library of Congress

1933 births
2008 deaths
Date of death missing
20th-century Indian linguists
People from Churu district
Place of death missing
Rajasthani people
Indian Sanskrit scholars
University of Rajasthan alumni